Helle Nielsen (born 17 February 1982) is a Danish retired midfielder who played for Vejle BK, SønderjyskE Fodbold and Denmark national team.

International career

Helle was also part of the Danish team at the 2005 European Championships.

References

1982 births
Living people
Danish women's footballers
Denmark women's international footballers
Women's association football midfielders
Association football midfielders
Denmark international footballers